Sophie Amalie Moth, Countess of Samsøe (28 March 1654 – 17 January 1719) was the officially acknowledged royal mistress of King Christian V of Denmark. Together they had six acknowledged illegitimate children, all of whom bore the surname Gyldenløve. In 1677 she was elevated to be the first Countess of Samsø. The still-existing Danish noble family of Danneskiold-Samsøe is descended from her.

Sophie Amalie Moth was the first officially acknowledged royal mistress in Denmark.

Biography

Sophie Amalie was born on 28 March 1654 as the daughter of Poul Moth (1601–1670), doctor of the royal court, and Ida Dorothea Bureneus (1624–1684).

The relationship with the monarch was more or less arranged by her mother, and started in 1671 or 1672. Sophie bore Christian six children, each of whom he acknowledged publicly. Consistent with the practice of his father and grandfather, all were given the surname Gyldenløve. 
 
In 1677 Sophie Amalie was given the title Countess of Samsø, a title which chancellor Peder Griffenfeld had been deprived of after falling from favor. The relationship was known within the royal court from the start, but it was not official until she was given her title and officially presented at court.

In 1679, her children were acknowledged; in 1685, they were officially introduced at court.

Moth lived quite discreetly and did not have any political influence; the only times that she used her influence were when she secured a few favours from the monarch for some of her relatives. Her brother Matthias Moth, in particular, used the connection to his advantage. In 1682, she was granted estates in Gottorp.

After Niels Juel's death in 1697, the king arranged for her to take over his mansion, today known as the Thott Palace after a later owner and housing the French Embassy in Copenhagen. Two years later Christian died and she lived a quiet life on her estate until her death in 1719, twenty years later. Christian Gyldenløve, their oldest son, took over the mansion after her.

Children
Sophie Amalie's six acknowledged illegitimate children by Christian V were:

References

Sources
Sophie Amalie Moth in Dansk Biografisk Leksikon 1. ed. (in Danish)
 Sophie Amalie Moth (1654 - 1719) at Dansk Kvindebiografisk Leksikon (in Danish)

Mistresses of Danish royalty
Moth Sophie
1654 births
18th-century Danish landowners
1719 deaths
17th-century Danish landowners